Franklin is a giant sequoia in Giant Forest, a sequoia grove where the largest tree in the world lives - the General Sherman. The Franklin tree is the eighth largest giant sequoia in the world. It was named by Wendell Flint after Benjamin Franklin. Nearby trees include the Washington Tree which was once the second largest tree in the world, but since it lost half its trunk in 2005 many sequoias are now larger.

Giant Forest, famed for its giant sequoia trees, is within Sequoia National Park. Four out of the ten largest trees by volume on the planet are said to be within the Giant Forest.

Dimensions

See also
 List of largest giant sequoias
 List of individual trees

References

External links
Franklin Tree - Famous Redwoods

Individual giant sequoia trees
Sequoia National Park

cy:Y Goedwig Gawraidd